A kerchief (from the Old French couvrechief, "cover head"), also known as a bandana, bandanna, or "Wild Rag" (in cowboy culture), is a triangular or square piece of cloth tied around the head, face or neck for protective or decorative purposes. The popularity of head kerchiefs may vary by culture or religion, often being used as a Christian headcovering by women of the Anabaptist, Eastern Orthodox, and Plymouth Brethren denominations, as well as by some Orthodox Jewish and Muslim women.

The neckerchief and handkerchief are related items.

Types

Bandana

A bandana or bandanna (from Sanskrit बन्धन or bandhana, "a bond") is a type of large, usually colourful kerchief, originating from the Indian subcontinent, often worn on the head or around the neck of a person. It is considered to be a hat by some. Bandanas are frequently printed in a paisley pattern and are most often used to hold hair back, either as a fashionable head accessory, or for practical purposes. It is also used to tie around the neck to prevent sunburn, and around the mouth and nose to protect from dust inhalation or to hide the identity of its wearer.

Bandanas originated in India as bright coloured handkerchiefs of silk and cotton with spots in white on coloured grounds, chiefly red and blue Bandhani. The silk styles were made of the finest quality yarns, and were popular. Bandana prints for clothing were first produced in Glasgow from cotton yarns, and are now made in many qualities. The term, at present, generally means a fabric in printed styles, whether silk, silk and cotton, or all cotton.

The word bandana stems from the Hindi words 'bāndhnū,' or "tie-dyeing," and 'bāndhnā,' "to tie." These stem from Sanskrit roots 'badhnāti,' "he ties," and Sanskrit 'bandhana' (बन्धन), "a bond." In the 18th and 19th centuries bandanas were frequently known as bandannoes.

Oramal

The Oramal is a traditional kerchief used in Central Asia and the Caucasus (note how it is tied, the neck is usually not covered by it). In some countries like Uzbekistan, it was traditionally used only at home, while in public the paranja was more popular. In other countries, like Kazakhstan, it was commonly used in public. In Kyrgyzstan, the white color is an indication that the woman is married.

As well it was widely used by men at horse riding in summertime instead of wearing a cap.

Austronesian headscarves
Kerchiefs are also worn as headdresses by Austronesian cultures in maritime Southeast Asia. Among Malay men it is known as tengkolok and is worn during traditional occasions, such as weddings (worn by the groom) and the pesilat.

See also 

 Handkerchief
 Handkerchief code
Other neckwear:
 Ascot tie
 Cravat
 Fichu
 Neckerchief
 Pañuelo
 Scarf
 Shawl

Other headwear
 Do-rag
 Hachimaki
 Headband
 Headscarf
 Hijab
 Keffiyeh
 Tengkolok

References 

Additional sources

 
 Yule, Henry, & A.C. Burnell (2013). Hobson-Jobson: The Definitive Glossary of British India. (Oxford, England: OUP). .

External links 
How to tie a bandanna

Headgear
Neckwear
Kerchiefs
Rodeo clothing
19th-century fashion
20th-century fashion
21st-century fashion 
Maritime culture